Lee Collins DeRamus is a former wide receiver in the National Football League. He was drafted in the sixth round of the 1995 NFL Draft and played two seasons with the New Orleans Saints.

Born in Stratford, New Jersey, and raised in Winslow Township, New Jersey, DeRamus attended Edgewood Regional High School.

References

External links
 Just Sports Stats

1972 births
Living people
American football wide receivers
People from Stratford, New Jersey
People from Winslow Township, New Jersey
New Orleans Saints players
Wisconsin Badgers football players
San Francisco Demons players
Players of American football from New Jersey
Sportspeople from Camden County, New Jersey
Ed Block Courage Award recipients